Léopold Boisselle (14 June 1903 – 15 March 1964) was a French racing cyclist. He rode in the 1928 Tour de France.

References

1903 births
1964 deaths
French male cyclists
Place of birth missing